Valdas Dambrauskas (born 7 January 1977) is a Lithuanian professional football manager who is the current manager of Greek Super League club OFI.

Managerial career

Early career
Valdas Dambrauskas studied Sport Science and Coaching in London Metropolitan University and worked as a coach in many famous youth academies, including Fulham, Manchester United and Brentford. His first senior managerial position was with Kingsbury London Tigers in Spartan South Midlands Football League Premier Division, where he managed team to the highest result in club history. For his work Dambrauskas was awarded in Active Westminster Awards. He also was head coach of Lithuania national under-17 football team between 2009 and 2010.

Ekranas
In December 2010, Dambrauskas joined Lithuanian champions Ekranas as an assistant coach to famous Lithuanian coach Valdas Urbonas. Together they won domestic double in 2011 season, received Supercup and won A Lyga champions title in 2012 campaign, while also reaching domestic cup final, where they lost to Žalgiris after penalties, and also placed 3rd in 2013. After Urbonas resignation, he became head coach of the team and despite scarce resources managed to place sixth in 2014 season, even though this did not help the club, and it was forced to declared bankruptcy after the season had ended. He also managed Lithuania national under-19 football team between 2011 and 2012.

Žalgiris
On 17 December 2014, Valdas Dambrauskas became new head coach of Lithuanian champions Žalgiris. Together with the team he managed to win every domestic title until 2017, including domestic quadruple in 2016 season. Žalgiris' winning streak finally came to an end on 24 September 2017 when they lost Lithuanian Football Cup Final to Stumbras. After that defeat club's morale was broken and they not only haven't won a single game in the league, but also were overtaken by Sūduva after a dramatic 0–3 head-to-head defeat in Marijampolė. This was Žalgiris' first league defeat by 3 goals since 2010 season.

Due to these defeats Dambrauskas decided to resign on 23 October 2017.

RFS

Dambrauskas joined Latvian Higher League side RFS on 6 December 2017.

Gorica
Dambrauskas joined Croatian First Football League side HNK Gorica on 25 February 2020.

Ludogorets Razgrad

On 3 January 2021, Dambrauskas, together with club's sports director Mindaugas Nikoličius, left Gorica.
The same day Valdas Dambrauskas was appointed as the head coach of Bulgarian champions PFC Ludogorets Razgrad. In early October 2021, Dambrauskas parted ways with the Razgrad team.

Managerial statistics

Honours

Managerial

Žalgiris
 A Lyga: 2015, 2016
 Lithuanian Cup: 2014–15, 2015–16, 2016
 Lithuanian Supercup: 2015, 2016, 2017

RFS
 Latvian Cup: 2019

Ludogorets Razgrad
 Bulgarian First League: 2020–21

Hajduk Split
 Croatian Football Cup: 2021–22

Individual
 Active Westminster Awards Active Coach: 2010
 A Lyga Manager of the Round: 2016 3rd round, 2017 1st round
 Lithuanian Coach of the Year: 2016, 2020, 2021

References

External links
Profile at lfe.lt 

1977 births
Living people
People from Pakruojis
Lithuanian football managers
FK Ekranas managers
FK Žalgiris managers
FK RFS managers
PFC Ludogorets Razgrad managers
HNK Hajduk Split managers
Lithuanian expatriate football managers
Expatriate football managers in England
Lithuanian expatriate sportspeople in England
Expatriate football managers in Latvia
Lithuanian expatriate sportspeople in Latvia
Expatriate football managers in Croatia
Lithuanian expatriate sportspeople in Croatia
Expatriate football managers in Bulgaria
Lithuanian expatriate sportspeople in Bulgaria
Brentford F.C. non-playing staff